HMS Harrier was an 18-gun  sloop, built for the Royal Navy during the 1830s.

Description
The ship's tonnage was 485 tons burthen. The Fly class was armed with a pair of 9-pounder cannon in the bow and sixteen 32-pounder carronades. The ships had a crew of 120 officers and ratings.

Construction and career
Harrier, the third ship of her name to serve in the Royal Navy, was ordered on 30 January 1829, laid down in November 1830 at Pembroke Dockyard, Wales, and launched on 8 November 1831. She was completed on 25 March 1832 at Plymouth Dockyard and commissioned on 24 November 1831.

Notes

References
 
 
 
 

Fly-class sloop
1831 ships
Ships built in Pembroke Dock